Hormiga negra is a 1979 Argentine film directed by Ricardo Defilippi.

Cast
Miguel Bianco
Víctor Bó
Osvaldo María Cabrera
Mario Casado
Víctor Catalano
Rolando Chávez
Rafael Chumbito
Luis Dávila
Roberto Escalada
Coco Fossati
Héctor Fuentes
Beto Gianola
Oscar Llompart
Aldo Mayo
Delia Montero
Arturo Noal
Pablo Palitos
Miguel Paparelli
Joaquín Piñón
Jorge Molina Sala

External links
 

1979 films
Argentine drama films
1970s Spanish-language films
1970s Argentine films